Chrysopogon is a genus of robber flies in the family Asilidae. There are at least 40 described species in Chrysopogon.

Species
These 43 species belong to the genus Chrysopogon:

 Chrysopogon agilis Clements, 1985 c g
 Chrysopogon albopunctatus (Macquart, 1846) c g
 Chrysopogon albosetosus Clements, 1985 c g
 Chrysopogon aureocinctus Clements, 1985 c g
 Chrysopogon aureus Clements, 1985 c g
 Chrysopogon bellus Clements, 1985 c g
 Chrysopogon bicolor Clements, 1985 c g
 Chrysopogon brunnipes Clements, 1985 c g
 Chrysopogon castaneus Clements, 1985 c g
 Chrysopogon catachrysus Clements, 1985 c g
 Chrysopogon conopsoides (Fabricius, 1775) c g
 Chrysopogon crabroniformis Roder, 1881 c g
 Chrysopogon daptes Clements, 1985 c g
 Chrysopogon dialeucus Clements, 1985 c g
 Chrysopogon diaphanes Clements, 1985 c g
 Chrysopogon fasciatus Ricardo, 1912 c g
 Chrysopogon fuscus Clements, 1985 c g
 Chrysopogon gammonensis Lavigne, 2006 c g
 Chrysopogon harpaleus Clements, 1985 c g
 Chrysopogon horni Hardy, 1934 c g
 Chrysopogon leucodema Clements, 1985 c g
 Chrysopogon megalius Clements, 1985 c g
 Chrysopogon melanorrhinus Clements, 1985 c g
 Chrysopogon melas Clements, 1985 c g
 Chrysopogon micrus Clements, 1985 c g
 Chrysopogon muelleri Roder, 1892 c g
 Chrysopogon pallidipennis White, 1918 c g
 Chrysopogon papuensis Clements, 1985 c g
 Chrysopogon paramonovi Clements, 1985 c g
 Chrysopogon parvus Clements, 1985 c g
 Chrysopogon pellos Clements, 1985 c g
 Chrysopogon pilosifacies Clements, 1985 c g
 Chrysopogon proximus Clements, 1985 c g
 Chrysopogon punctatus Ricardo, 1912 c g
 Chrysopogon queenslandi Ricardo, 1912 c g
 Chrysopogon rubidipennis White, 1918 c g
 Chrysopogon rufulus White, 1914 c g
 Chrysopogon rutilus Clements, 1985 c g
 Chrysopogon sphecodes Clements, 1985 c g
 Chrysopogon splendidissimus Ricardo, 1912 c g
 Chrysopogon trianguliferus Clements, 1985 c g
 Chrysopogon whitei Hull, 1958 c g
 Chrysopogon xanthus Clements, 1985 c g

Data sources: i = ITIS, c = Catalogue of Life, g = GBIF, b = Bugguide.net

References

Further reading

External links

 
 

Asilidae genera